This is a list of notable people who have died in prison, whether in prison or in hospital while still serving a prison sentence. This list does not include inmates who were executed as punishment for their crimes.

See also 
 :Category:People who died in prison custody
 Death in custody
 Lists of people by cause of death
 Prisoner suicide

References 

prison
Prison
 |Deaths